Hla Myint may also refer to:

 Hla Myint (1920–2017), Burmese economist
 Hla Myint (brigadier general) (born c. 1948), former mayor of Yangon (2011–2016), former brigadier-general in Myanmar Army
 Hla Myint Swe (minister), former Minister of Transport, Myanmar
 Hla Myint Swe (artist) (born 1948), Burmese artist